Jeppestown South is a suburb of Johannesburg, South Africa. It is located in Region F of the City of Johannesburg Metropolitan Municipality.  Two schools are located in the suburb, John Mitchell Primary School (principal Mr Rotteveel) and Jules High School (principal Mr G van Vuuren) which was formerly known as Edith Hinds High School.

Johannesburg Region F